2nd Medical Brigade (2 Med Bde) is a formation of the British Army formed under 1st UK Division. It predominantly provides deployed hospital care via 13 Field Hospitals. It also provides specialist medical capabilities via three Nationally Recruited Units; 306 Hospital Support Regiment, 335 Medical Evacuation Regiment and Medical Operational Support Group.

History
Headquarters 2nd Medical Brigade was initially formed at Imphal Barracks, York under the title of The Medical Group on 1 April 2002, as a consequence of the Strategic Defence Review.

The HQ has operational command of the 3 Regular Cadre field hospitals, 10 independent Reserve field hospitals, a medical evacuation regiment and 3 other specialist regiments. It also provides the enhanced medical operational command and control (C2) capability lost by the Army Medical Services (AMS).
The brigade has significantly raised the quality of pre-deployment medical training, seeing it provide a high standard of field medical care at field hospitals in Afghanistan.

In March 2020, as part of Operation Rescript, 256 Field Hospital helped construct a temporary critical care hospital, named NHS Nightingale Hospital London, during the COVID-19 pandemic in the United Kingdom.

Future 
Under the Future Soldier programme announced on 25 November 2021, the brigade will be reduced to a Colonel's Command.  Subsequently, many units will be moved under direct command of the divisions (see future structure below).  The new command will be known as '2nd Medical Group'.  In addition, the group will transfer from 1st Division to 'Field Army Troops', reporting directly to Commander Field Army.  The role of the group was described as follows: "The 2nd Medical Group will generate field hospitals and task-organised medical support to the deployed force.  It will be significantly reinforced by Army Reserve multi-role medical regiments and specialist medical capabilities.

Emblem
The centre cross within the emblem represents the Red Cross, under which the majority of the AMS operates in accordance with the Geneva Conventions.

Each arm of the Cross represents one of the four corps that make up the Army Medical Services, which are:
Royal Army Medical Corps (RAMC)
Queen Alexandra's Royal Army Nursing Corps (QARANC)
Royal Army Dental Corps (RADC)
Royal Army Veterinary Corps (RAVC)
The Rod and the Serpent - The centre of the emblem depicts the Rod of Aesculapius who lived in ancient Greece in the year 1256BC.  Aesculapius was known in ancient Greece as the father of medicine and was raised to God status according to Greek mythology. The serpent was revered by the ancient Greeks as having healing powers and combined with the Rod of Aesculapius has been recognised as the international symbol of medicine and healing since 1200BC.

List of structures

References

External links
2 Medical Brigade Website

Military units and formations established in 2002
2nd, Medical
2nd, United Kingdom
British Army Landmark programme
2002 establishments in the United Kingdom